Henry Bergman (February 23, 1868 – October 22, 1946) was an American actor of stage and film, known for his long association with Charlie Chaplin.

Biography
Born in San Francisco, California, Bergman acted in live theatre, appearing in Henrietta in 1888 at the Hollis Street Theatre in Boston and in the touring production of The Senator in 1892 and 1893. He made his Broadway debut in 1899 appearing with Anna Held in Papa's Wife, the musical hit of the year. He made his first film appearance with the L-KO Kompany in 1914 at the age of forty-six.

In 1916, Bergman started working with Charlie Chaplin, beginning with The Floorwalker. For the rest of his career, Bergman remained a character actor for Chaplin and worked as a studio assistant, including Assistant Director. He played in many Chaplin shorts and later features, including The Pawnshop, The Immigrant, A Dog's Life, The Gold Rush, The Circus, and City Lights. Bergman's last on-screen appearance was in Modern Times as a restaurant manager, and his final off-screen contribution was for The Great Dictator in 1940. Chaplin helped Bergman finance a restaurant in Hollywood, named "Henry's", which became a popular spot for celebrities as a precursor to the later Brown Derby restaurant.

Henry Bergman continued to be associated with the Chaplin Studios until his death from a heart attack in 1946. He is interred in the Hillside Memorial Park Cemetery in Culver City, California.

Filmography

References

External links

 
 
 
 

American male film actors
American male silent film actors
Male actors from San Francisco
Silent film comedians
1868 births
1946 deaths
19th-century American male actors
American male stage actors
20th-century American male actors
Burials at Hillside Memorial Park Cemetery
20th-century American comedians
American male comedy actors
Comedians from California